Rep is a small settlement in the Pohorje Hills in the Municipality of Slovenska Bistrica in northeastern Slovenia. The area is part of the traditional region of Styria. It is now included with the rest of the municipality in the Drava Statistical Region.

A small roadside chapel to the east of the village was built after the First World War in memory of a local soldier killed.

References

External links
Rep at Geopedia

Populated places in the Municipality of Slovenska Bistrica

nl:Bojtina